Tools for Conviviality is a 1973 book by Ivan Illich about the proper use of technology. It was published only two years after his previous book Deschooling Society. In this new work Illich generalized the themes that he had previously applied to the field of education: the institutionalization of specialized knowledge, the dominant role of technocratic elites in industrial society, and the need to develop new instruments for the reconquest of practical knowledge by the average citizen. He wrote that "[e]lite professional groups ... have come to exert a 'radical monopoly' on such basic human activities as health, agriculture, home-building, and learning, leading to a 'war on subsistence' that robs peasant societies of their vital skills and know-how. The result of much economic development is very often not human flourishing but 'modernized poverty', dependency, and an out-of-control system in which the humans become worn-down mechanical parts." Illich proposed that we should "invert the present deep structure of tools" in order to "give people tools that guarantee their right to work with independent efficiency."

The idea of the 'radical monopoly' is also applied to the effects of cars on the urban form, as "speedy vehicles of all kinds render space scarce." Ivan Illich contributes to a radical critique of modern urbanism: "this monopoly over land turns space into car fodder. It destroys the environment for feet and bicycles. Even if planes and buses could run as nonpolluting, nondepleting public services, their inhuman velocities would degrade man's innate mobility and force him to spend more time for the sake of travel."

Tools for Conviviality attracted worldwide attention. A résumé of it was published by French social philosopher André Gorz in Les Temps Modernes, under the title "Freeing the Future". The book's vision of tools that would be developed and maintained by a community of users had a significant influence on the first developers of the personal computer, notably Lee Felsenstein.

Further reading 

 
 
 
 
 
 
 
 
 

1973 non-fiction books
English-language books
Harper & Row books
Technology books